KLOK (1170 kHz "Punjabi Radio USA 1170 AM") is a commercial AM radio station broadcasting a radio format of Punjabi language talk and Punjabi music. Licensed to San Jose, California, the station serves the San Francisco Bay Area. Since June 2009, KLOK 1170 AM has served the South Asian community.

By day, KLOK is powered at 50,000 watts, the maximum for American AM stations. At night, it reduces power to 9,000 watts.  It uses a directional antenna in the daytime, helping it cover most of the Bay Area.

History
E. L. Barker founded KLOK and began broadcasting on October 13, 1946. Initially, the station broadcast with a 5,000 watt daytime signal, later adding a 1,000 watt nighttime signal in 1952. The power increased to 10,000 watts in the daytime and 5,000 watts in the night time on June 29, 1964. Mr. Barker sold KLOK Radio to Davis Broadcasting (which later became the Weaver Davis Fowler Corporation) in 1967. On August 10, 1969, KLOK increased the daytime power to its current 50,000 watts. These historical dates are listed on a plaque near the entrance of the station's former studios (and current transmitter site) in San Jose.

In the late sixties and seventies, the station broadcast "oldies" pop music eventually changing into Adult Contemporary. One of the popular DJs in the late 1960s was Jon Badeaux. By the early 1980s, KLOK's parent company also owned KLOK-FM (San Francisco), KWIZ (Santa Ana) and KFIG (Fresno). According to Ad Week, all five stations eventually shared the same stunt format, a "Yes/No Radio" format, which was developed by KLOK Executive VP and GM, Bill Weaver. This allowed the station to leverage branding, advertising, and jingles by JAM Creative Productions before the switchover in August 1988. In this format, listeners would respond to the "KLOK Yes/No Music Poll" by calling into the station and voting "Yes" if they would like the song added to the playlist or "No" to have a certain song removed from the playlist. The last song played on KLOK as an Adult Contemporary station was "When Will I See You Again" by The Three Degrees. 

KLOK flipped to Spanish-language on August 9, 1988. KLOK was purchased by brothers Danny Villanueva and James Villanueva, owners of Radio América, Inc, Bahia Radio, and KBRG 104.9, as Spanish-language music talk format "KLOK Radio Reloj." The first song played on Radio Reloj was Argentine singer, Ricardo Ceratto "El Sol Nace Para Todos." In 1989, EXCL Communications bought KLOK and KBRG from Radio América, Inc and flipped to a Regional Mexican format under the name "KLOK Con la Música de México" and later Tricolor. In 2000, Entravision acquired both KLOK and KBRG from EXCL. The station flipped to Cumbia 1170 AM format. On January 1, 2006, Univision purchased both KLOK and KBRG from Entravision and switched it to a Spanish Talk format. The station maintained this format until 2009, when its sale by Univision Radio to Principle Broadcasting Network was followed by a change to a format billed as "New International Community Radio" and later "Desi 1170 AM" generally consisting of South Asian music.

On May 1, 2018, KLOK switched to the "Radio Zindagi" Indian talk and music format after KZDG (1550 AM) in San Francisco dropped it in favor of a simulcast with KGMZ-FM.

On July 4, 2021, KLOK brought the "Mirchi" brand to the South Asian population in the Bay Area.

On January 24, 2023, Punjabi American Media’s “Punjabi Radio USA” announced an agreement to acquire KLOK from Tron Dinh Do for $2.85 million.

References

External links
FCC History Cards for KLOK

LOK (AM)
LOK (AM)
Mass media in San Jose, California
Radio stations established in 1946
1946 establishments in California
Asian-American culture in San Francisco
Hindi-language mass media in the United States
Indian-American culture in California